Frederick Lawrence may refer to:

 Frederick G. Lawrence, American philosopher and theologian
 Frederick Geoffrey Lawrence (1902–1967), British lawyer
 Frederick M. Lawrence (born 1955), American legal scholar and former president of Brandeis University
 Frederick N. Lawrence (1834–1916), American financier and president of the New York Stock Exchange
 Frederick Pethick-Lawrence, 1st Baron Pethick-Lawrence (1871–1961), British politician 
 Frederick William Lawrence (1890–1974), Canadian/American airbrush painter

See also
 Frederic C. Lawrence (1899–1989), suffragan bishop of the Diocese of Massachusetts